Thomas Joshua Cooper  (born December 19, 1946) is an American photographer. He is considered among the premier contemporary landscape photographers.

Early life and education
Cooper studied art, philosophy and literature and received his bachelor’s degree from Humboldt State University in Arcata, California in 1969. In 1972, he received his master’s of art in photography with honors from the University of New Mexico.

Inspiration 
Cooper was inspired by the works of the photographers of the f/64 group of the 1930s and 1940s, such as Ansel Adams. Cooper stated, "I'll live and die by the late works of Edward Weston, Alfred Stieglitz and Paul Strand, and I think Robert Frank is the most extraordinary living photographic picture-maker."

Career 
Cooper's first solo show took place in 1971. He has had more than 95 solo exhibitions since then. After teaching art and photography in a number of schools in California, Cooper moved to England.

In 1982 he launched the Fine Art Photography programme at the Glasgow School of Art. He is now retired. 

Cooper loves being a photographer, but is frustrated by some of the vocabulary that is used in the field. He indicates, "I hate the words "snap", "shoot" and "take" when it comes to making photographs. Everything I do is very seriously built up. They are 'made' pictures."

Not only a photographer, Cooper is a poet and has written haiku books. Most of them are inspired by nature and reflect his photography.

In 2009 Cooper achieved a Guggenheim Fellowship in Photography.

Cooper has lived in Scotland since the 1980s and he is represented by Ingleby Gallery, Edinburgh, Scotland.

At the end of September, 2019, on the 500th anniversary of the beginning of Magellan's circumnavigation of the world, Cooper opened for the first time “The Atlas of Emptiness and Extremity,” at the Los Angeles County Museum of Art: In an exhibition called 'The World's Edge'  comprising 65 large-scale and 75 8 x 10 black-and-white photographs, showcases Cooper’s The Atlas of Emptiness and Extremity, The World’s Edge, and The Atlantic Basin Project, which he first embarked upon in 1987, to chart the Atlantic Basin from the extreme points of each north, south, east, and west coordinates. Open from 21 September until 2 February 2020 in the Resnick Pavilion.

Awards and honours
 1970, John D. Phelen Award in Art and Literature .
 1994, Major Artists Award, Scottish Arts Council, Edinburgh, Scotland 
 1999, Major Artist’s Award, Lannan Foundation, Santa Fe, New Mexico 
 2014, Elected a Fellow of the Royal Society of Edinburgh

Museums
Cooper’s works are held by over fifty museums and public collections, among them:
 Art Institute of Chicago, Chicago, Illinois
 Denver Art Museum, Denver Colorado
The J. Paul Getty Museum, Los Angeles, California
Museum of Fine Arts, Houston (MFAH), Houston, Texas
 Los Angeles County Museum of Art (LACMA), Los Angeles, California
Carré d'Art (Nîmes Museum of Contemporary Art), Nîmes, France
Princeton University Art Museum, Princeton,  New Jersey
The Tate Gallery, London, England
The Victoria and Albert Museum, London, England

Notes

Further reading
 Cotter, Holland (28 June 1996) "Art in Review; Thomas Joshua Cooper" The New York Times
 Cullen, Fintan and Morrison, John (editors) (2005) "A Shared Legacy: Essays on Irish and Scottish Art and Visual Culture Ashgate, Aldershot, Hants, England, 
Govan, Michael and Morse, Rebecca  (2019) Thomas Joshua Cooper: The World's Edge -
 Yau, John (2006) Ojo de agua - Thomas Joshua Cooper(Exhibition Ojo de Agua - Eye of the Water'', at Pace Wildenstein, 1 December 2006 - 13 January 2007) Pace Wildenstein Publications, New York, 
 Thomas Joshua Cooper at the Scottish Parliament talking about his life as a photographer at an exhibit of two of his works as part of a series that explores the extremities of the landscape at the points of civilization that are located furthest north, west, south, and east on the map of Scotland.
http://www.parliament.scot/visitandlearn/24316.aspx

External links
Ingleby Gallery
Exhibition at ARTseeninSOHO
The Pace Gallery
Galerie Thomas Schulte
Galerie Thomas Schulte
 https://www.newyorker.com/magazine/2019/10/07/a-photographer-at-the-ends-of-the-earth
 https://www.hauserwirth.com/hauser-wirth-exhibitions/26106-thomas-joshua-cooper

1946 births
Living people
Photographers from San Francisco
American people of Cherokee descent
Landscape photographers
20th-century American photographers
21st-century American photographers
California State Polytechnic University, Humboldt alumni